Women and Children First is the third studio album by American rock band Van Halen, released on March 26, 1980, on Warner Bros. Records. Produced by Ted Templeman and engineered by Donn Landee, it was the first Van Halen album not to feature any cover songs, and is described by critic Stephen Thomas Erlewine as "[the] record where the group started to get heavier, both sonically and, to a lesser extent, thematically."

Background and recording
The opening track, "And the Cradle Will Rock..." begins with what sounds like a guitar, but is actually a phase shifter-effected Wurlitzer electric piano played through Eddie Van Halen's 1960s model 100-watt Marshall Plexi amplifier. 

Like the two preceding albums, Women and Children First was recorded in Hollywood at Sunset Studios, in about two weeks' time. The album features more studio overdubs and less emphasis on backing vocals, partly because two of the songs, "In a Simple Rhyme" and "Take Your Whiskey Home", had already been written and recorded in a 1974 Cherokee Studios demo, before Michael Anthony had joined them, albeit both with some differences lyrically and musically. Two other songs were also played live earlier, "Fools" was played as early as 1975, while "Loss of Control" was debuted in 1977.

"Could This Be Magic?" contains the only female backing vocal ever recorded for a Van Halen song; Nicolette Larson sings during some of the choruses. The rain sound in the background is not an effect; it was raining outside, and the band decided to record the sound in stereo using two Neumann KM84 microphones, and added it to the track.

The album contains a track at the end of "In a Simple Rhyme", a brief instrumental piece entitled "Growth", which begins at 4:19. While "Growth" faded out on the original vinyl LP and cassette, it was given a cold ending at full volume on the compact disc. At the time the band was considering starting what would become their next album, Fair Warning, with a continuation of "Growth", but this did not occur. "Growth" was a staple of the band's live shows with Roth and often used as the start of their encores.

Several outtakes from these sessions exist, including an unreleased instrumental often referred to as "Act Like It Hurts", which was the title Eddie Van Halen originally wanted for "Tora! Tora!" "Act Like It Hurts" was also the source of a riff used for the song "House of Pain", released on 1984.

The first single from the album was the keyboard-driven "And the Cradle Will Rock..." Although it was not a success like previous singles "Dance the Night Away" or the cover of "You Really Got Me", the album itself was well-received, went platinum within a year and further entrenched the band as a popular concert draw. The song "Everybody Wants Some!!" was also a concert staple through the 1984 tour, and continued to be played by David Lee Roth after he left Van Halen.

The vinyl LP version included a poster of a photograph by Helmut Newton featuring Roth chained to a fence.

Critical reception

Reviews for Women and Children First were generally favorable. David Fricke for Rolling Stone highlights the songs, "Romeo Delight", "Everybody Wants Some!!", and "Loss of Control", calling them "works of high-volume art". Fricke praises the band, calling them "exceptionally good players". Both Fricke and Robert Christgau compare Eddie's guitar work to Jimi Hendrix. Christgau gives the album a B rating, stating, "[Eddie] earns the Hendrix comparisons, and he's no clone--he's faster, colder, more structural." In a retrospective review for AllMusic, Stephen Thomas Erlewine rated the album 4.5 stars out of 5. Erlewine calls the album, "mature, or at least... a little serious", noting "there's a bit of a dark heart beating on this record".

Kerrang! magazine listed the album at number 30 among the "100 Greatest Heavy Metal Albums of All Time", and Rolling Stone listed the album at number 36 in their list of "The 100 Greatest Metal Albums of All Time".

Track listing

Personnel
Van Halen
David Lee Roth – lead vocals, acoustic guitar on "Could This Be Magic?"
Eddie Van Halen – guitars, electric piano, backing vocals
Michael Anthony – bass guitar, backing vocals
Alex Van Halen – drums

Additional musicians
Nicolette Larson – backing vocals on "Could This Be Magic?"

Production
Pete Angelus – creative consultant
Chris Bellman – remastering
Donn Landee – engineer
Gene Meros – engineer
Jo Motta – project coordinator
Helmut Newton – poster photo
Norman Seeff – cover photo
Richard Seireeni – art direction
Ted Templeman – production

Charts

Weekly Charts

Year-end Charts

Charting Singles

Certifications

References

Further reading

Album chart usages for Billboard200
Van Halen albums
1980 albums
Warner Records albums
Albums produced by Ted Templeman
Albums recorded at Sunset Sound Recorders